George Lewis (born 1943) is an American retired television journalist who worked for NBC News for 43 years from 1969 to 2012. His stories have appeared on NBC Nightly News.

Lewis joined NBC in December 1969 as a war correspondent covering the Vietnam War. He also covered the Iranian hostage crisis from 1979 to 1981, the 1989 Tiananmen Square revolt in China, and Operation Desert Storm in 1991. Lewis has won three Emmys, the George Foster Peabody Award, and the Edward R. Murrow Award throughout his career covering wars and other events abroad.

Based in Los Angeles, Lewis now regularly reports on the revolution in information technology.  In 1993, he did a Nightly News series titled Almost 2001, which marked the beginning of interactive electronic exchanges between television networks and their viewers.  Those watching the reports were urged to send e-mails, some of which were read on the air.  It was an early use of the word "dot-com" on a news program.  He retired from NBC News on January 25, 2012.

References

External links
 George Lewis

1943 births
Living people
American television reporters and correspondents
American war correspondents
American war correspondents of the Vietnam War
American male journalists
Journalists from California
NBC News people
San Diego State University alumni
People from San Bernardino, California
20th-century American journalists